Guerra a muerte (lit. English: War to the death) is a term coined by Benjamín Vicuña Mackenna and used in Chilean historiography to describe the irregular, no-quarter warfare that broke out from 1819 to 1821 during the Chilean War of Independence. 

After the royalists had been expelled from all cities and ports north of the Bio-Bio River, Vicente Benavides organized royalist resistance in La Frontera with the aid of Mapuche chiefs. The aid of the Mapuches was vital to the royalists since they had lost control of all cities and ports north of Valdivia. Most Mapuches valued the treaties they had with the Spanish authorities, while many other Mapuches regarded the matter with indifference and played both sides against each other. The Pincheira brothers, a future outlaw group, served Benavides in the Guerra a muerte by defending the Cordillera.

As result of the Guerra a muerte the government of nascent republic begun to distrust the Franciscan missionaries of Chillán who were regarded as representatives of the old regime. This led to the recruitment of a new contingent of missionaries for Chillán in the 1830s.

See also
Banditry in Chile
Parliament of Tapihue (1825)

Sources
.

Chilean War of Independence
Mapuche history